Jose Antonio Olvera de los Santos (born March 4, 1986, in Torreon, Coahuila) is a Mexican footballer. He currently plays for Tampico Madero of the Ascenso MX as a defender or midfielder.

Olvera is known for his left foot and also because he played for Santos Laguna from 2004 to 2006. He was traded to Chivas starting the 2007 season. Olvera had already played as a loan from Santos to Chivas de Guadalajara in the Copa Libertadores in 2006 where Chivas reached semi-finals losing against São Paulo FC. He has also been capped in the cycle of Ricardo LaVolpe with Mexico three times debuting against Hungary. On July 24, 2007, he made his first appearance with Chivas in the superliga where they faced FC Dallas and he scored a goal.

On December 19, 2008, it was announced that Olvera would go on loan to Toluca. In December 2009, it was announced that Olvera would go back to Santos Laguna.

He was born in the old Estadio Corona, home of the Santos Laguna; by that time his mother worked in maintenance of the stadium when the delivery took place.

Honours
Morelia
Copa MX (1): Apertura 2013
Supercopa MX (1): 2014

International appearances
As of 15 February 2006

External links

1986 births
Footballers from Coahuila
Mexican footballers
Liga MX players
Santos Laguna footballers
C.D. Guadalajara footballers
Living people
Mexico international footballers
Sportspeople from Torreón
Association football defenders